Wdowiak is a Polish surname. Notable people with the surname include:

 Grzegorz Wdowiak (born 1970), Polish rower
 Mateusz Wdowiak (born 1996), Polish footballer

See also
 

Polish-language surnames